Mesilla Valley Mall is a  shopping mall located on  in Las Cruces, New Mexico, USA. It is managed by Namdar Realty Group. Opened in 1981, the indoor shopping center has 85 stores.

Mesilla Valley Mall is the only regional mall in southern New Mexico, with a trade area encompassing 66 zip codes in Southern New Mexico and West Texas.

On August 31, 2019, it was announced that Sears would be closing this location a part of a plan to close 92 stores nationwide. The store closed in December 2019.

Anchor stores
JCPenney
Dillard's
Barnes & Noble
Conn's HomePlus
Cineport 10 Theatre

References

External links
Official website

Shopping malls in New Mexico
Shopping malls established in 1981
Buildings and structures in Las Cruces, New Mexico
Namdar Realty Group